Callibaetis fluctuans is a species of small minnow mayfly in the family Baetidae. It is found in southeastern Canada, the continental United States, and Alaska.

References

Mayflies
Articles created by Qbugbot
Insects described in 1862